Oddernes is a former municipality that was located in the old Vest-Agder county in Norway.  The  municipality existed from 1838 until its dissolution in 1964. The administrative centre was the village of Lund on the east side of the river Otra near where Lund Church is located.  The former area of the municipality makes up the area just west of the urban town of Kristiansand within the municipality of Kristiansand in Agder county. The old municipality encircled the town of Kristiansand, and it included the villages such as Flekkerøy, Vågsbygd, Slettheia, Lund, Strai, Mosby, and Justvik. Today, the town of Kristiansand has a borough named Oddernes, but it has very different boundaries than the old municipality had.

History
The parish of Oddernæs was established as a municipality on 1 January 1838 (see formannskapsdistrikt law). According to the 1835 census, the municipality had a population of 2,373.  On 31 December 1893, the area on the east side of the Topdalsfjorden (population: 1,113) was separated to form the new municipality of Randesund.  The split left Oddernes with 3,076 inhabitants.  On 1 July 1921, the area of Lund (population: 2,164) which is located on the headland between the mouth of the river Otra and the Topdalsfjorden was transferred from Oddernes municipality to the town of Kristiansand, constituting a new borough in the town.  

During the 1960s, there were many municipal mergers across Norway due to the work of the Schei Committee. On 1 January 1965, the town of Kristiansand (population: 27,100) was greatly expanded by merging with the neighboring municipalities of Oddernes (population: 18,668), Randesund (population: 1,672), and Tveit (population: 2,802).

Today, the borough of Oddernes hardly corresponds to the old municipality. In fact, the Hånes area in Oddernes borough is the only part of the borough that was also in the old municipality of Oddernes. Other places in Kristiansand that were a part of Oddernes was the entire Vågsbygd borough (except for Voiebyen) as well as Hellemyr, Strai, Mosby, Lund, and Justvik.  Oddernes Church is now actually located in the borough of Lund, but it still has the same name today.  Similarly, the old Oddernes High School is located in Vågsbygd Centrum, but it changed the name to Vågsbygd High School since it is no longer in Oddernes.

Name
The municipality (originally the parish) is named after the old Oddernæs farm since this is where the Oddernes Church was located.  The first part of the name comes from its location along the Otra river, and nes means peninsula, so the peninsula along the Otra river.

Government
All municipalities in Norway, including Oddernes, are responsible for primary education (through 10th grade), outpatient health services, senior citizen services, unemployment and other social services, zoning, economic development, and municipal roads.  The municipality was governed by a municipal council of elected representatives, which in turn elected a mayor.

Municipal council
The municipal council  of Oddernes was made up of representatives that were elected to four year terms.  The party breakdown of the final municipal council was as follows:

See also
List of former municipalities of Norway

References

Kristiansand
Former municipalities of Norway
1838 establishments in Norway
1965 disestablishments in Norway